The government of New Mexico is the governmental structure of the state of New Mexico as established by the Constitution of New Mexico. The executive is composed of the governor, several other statewide elected officials and the governor's cabinet. The New Mexico Legislature consists of the House of Representatives and Senate. The judiciary is composed of the New Mexico Supreme Court and lower courts. There is also local government, consisting of county administrations, city governments, and special districts.

Executive 
The state elected officials are:

The New Mexico Governor's Cabinet includes:

 Office of African American Affairs
 Department of Aging and Long-Term Services
 Department of Agriculture
 Department of Children, Youth, and Families
 Department of Corrections
 Department of Cultural Affairs
 Department of Economic Development
 Department of Energy, Minerals, and Natural Resources
 Office of the State Engineer
 Department of Environment
 Department of Finance and Administration
 Department of General Services
 Department of Health
 Department of Higher Education
 Department of Homeland Security and Emergency Management
 Department of Human Services
 Department of Indian Affairs
 Department of Information Technology
 Office of State Personnel
 Department of Public Education
 Department of Public Safety
 Department of Regulation and Licensing
 Department of Taxation and Revenue
 Department of Tourism
 Department of Transportation
 Department of Veteran Services
 Department of Worker's Compensation
 Department of Workforce Solutions

Legislature 

The New Mexico Legislature is a bicameral body made up of the 70-member New Mexico House of Representatives and the 42-member New Mexico Senate. The New Mexico Constitution limits the regular session to sixty calendar days, and every other year it is thirty days. The lieutenant governor presides over the Senate, while the speaker of the House is elected from that body in a closed door majority member caucus. Both have wide latitude in choosing committee membership in their respective houses and have a large impact on lawmaking in the state.

Judiciary 
The New Mexico Supreme Court is the highest court. It is primarily an appellate court, only having original jurisdiction in a limited number of actions; criminal cases in which the death penalty or life imprisonment is sought, appeals from the New Mexico Public Regulation Commission, and cases involving the writ of habeas corpus are reviewed directly by the Supreme Court. The court's five justices are chosen by statewide election, or appointed by the governor if to fill a seat that has become vacant mid-term.

The New Mexico Court of Appeals is the intermediate-level appellate court. The court has general appellate jurisdiction over the district courts and certain state agencies. Ten judges preside, sitting in panels of three.

The New Mexico district courts are courts of general jurisdiction. They hear cases involving: tort, contract, real property rights, estate; exclusive domestic relations, mental health, appeals for administrative agencies and lower courts, miscellaneous civil jurisdiction; misdemeanor; exclusive criminal appeals jurisdiction; and exclusive juvenile jurisdiction. There are thirteen judicial districts.

The New Mexico magistrate courts are courts of limited jurisdiction. They hear cases involving: tort, contract, landlord/tenant rights ($0–10,000); felony preliminary hearings; and misdemeanor, DWI/DUI and other traffic violations. There are fifty-four magistrate courts.

The New Mexico probate courts are courts of limited jurisdiction and do not hold jury trials. There is one for each of New Mexico's thirty-three counties.

The New Mexico municipal courts are courts of limited jurisdiction and do not hold jury trials. They hear cases involving: petty misdemeanors, DWI/DUI, traffic violations and other municipal ordinance violations.

The Bernalillo County Metropolitan Court is a court of limited jurisdiction of Bernalillo County. It hears cases involving: tort, contract, landlord and tenant rights ($0–10,000); felony first appearances; misdemeanor, DWI/DUI, domestic violence, and other traffic violations.

Local government 

Local government in New Mexico consists of counties and municipalities. There are thirty-three counties, of which Bernalillo County, containing the state's largest city Albuquerque, is the most populous. Counties are usually governed by an elected five-member county commission, sheriff, assessor, clerk and treasurer. A municipality may call itself a village, town, or city, and there is no distinction in law and no correlation to any particular form (Mayor-Council, Commission-Manager, etc.). Municipal elections are non-partisan. In addition, limited local authority can be vested in special districts and landowners' associations.

References

External links 
 NewMexico.gov

 
New Mexico